Diary of a Mad Band is the second studio album from American R&B group Jodeci, released December 21, 1993, on Uptown Records and distributed through MCA Records.  The album also featured the first-ever album appearances from Timbaland, Missy Elliott (credited as Misdemeanor) and Sista, two years before the latter group became known in the music industry. New Jersey rapper Redman also makes a guest appearance on the album. It was Jodeci's second album to reach number one on the R&B album chart, where it stayed for two weeks.  It spawned the number 1 R&B hit "Cry for You"; the number 2 R&B hit "Feenin'", and the Top 15 R&B hit "What About Us". Despite not being released as a single, the album's opening track, "My Heart Belongs To U", was also an urban radio hit with it peaking at #55 & charting for 20 weeks on the Billboard R&B/Hip-Hop Airplay chart.  To date, the album has sold over four million copies in the United States and six million worldwide.

Release and reception

Dimitri Ehrlich of Entertainment Weekly wrote that at times bested the group's first, stating that the songs on their sophomore effort "often transcend the formulaic histrionics that marred their debut." AllMusic critic Ron Wynn deemed the record "jarring" and "mismatched", preferring its sentimental love songs to the sexually explicit, hip hop-influenced "come-on numbers", which he found to be in poor taste. Rohan B. Preston from the Chicago Tribune found the lyrics clichéd and Jodeci "certainly not as funky as H-Town nor as stirring as Boyz II Men at their best". Robert Christgau was even less impressed and assigned it a "neither" symbol in his Consumer Guide book, indicating an album that "may impress once or twice with consistent craft or an arresting track or two. Then it won't."

Track listing

Charts

Weekly charts

Year-end charts

Singles

"—" denotes releases that did not chart.

Certifications

Personnel
Information taken from Allmusic.

arranging – Dalvin DeGrate, Cedric "K-Ci" Hailey, DeVante Swing
recording engineer  – Prince Charles Alexander
assistant engineer – Steve Fitzmaurice
creative director – Brett Wright
scratches - Timbaland
executive producers – Tim Dawg, Andre Harrell, Jodeci, Steve Lucas
guitar – Darryl Pearson
horn – Charles "Prince Charles" Alexander
mastering – Chris Gehringer
mixing – Charles "Prince Charles" Alexander, Bob Brockman, Dalvin DeGrate, Steve Fitzmaurice, Tony Maserati, DeVante Swing, John Wydrycs
multi-instruments – Dalvin DeGrate, DeVante Swing
talkbox - Mike "Funky Mike" Jackson
photography – Daniel Hastings
production – Mr. Dalvin, DeVante Swing
production coordination – Dean "Mr. Magoo" Moodie
vocal consultant – Kenny Hicks
backing vocals – Jodeci
guest vocals – Redman, Timbaland, Sista and Misdemeanor

See also
List of number-one R&B albums of 1994 (U.S.)

Notes

External links
 
 Diary of a Mad Band at Discogs

1993 albums
Jodeci albums
MCA Records albums
Uptown Records albums